Polystira lindae is a species of sea snail, a marine gastropod mollusk in the family Turridae, the turrids.

Description
Original description: "Shell small for genus, slender, elongated; whorls rounded, without shoulder; body whorl with 5 large, sharp-edged cords; spire whorls with 3 cords; siphonal canal with numerous fine spiral threads; anal notch narrow, deep; shell color pure white, interior of aperture white; periostracum thick, velvety."

The shell of the Polystira lindae resembles a cone with a sharp tip.

Distribution
Locus typicus: "Gulf of Venezuela -
off Punto Fijo, Paraguana Peninsula, Venezuela."

This species occurs in the North Atlantic Ocean, 
Caribbean Sea, Gulf of Venezuela

References

External links
  Todd J.A. & Rawlings T.A. (2014). A review of the Polystira clade — the Neotropic’s largest marine gastropod radiation (Neogastropoda: Conoidea: Turridae sensu stricto). Zootaxa. 3884(5): 445-491

lindae
Gastropods described in 1987